Priyadarshini Chatterjee (born 5 September 1996) is an Indian model and beauty pageant titleholder who was crowned Femina Miss India World in 2016. She represented India at the Miss World 2016 pageant. She is the first northeast Indian to represent India at Miss World. She made it to the top 20 (semi-finalist) and also top-5 in Beauty with a Purpose.

Early life
She was born in Dhubri in a Bengali family and was brought up in Guwahati city in the state of Assam. She completed her schooling in Maria's Public School in Guwahati and moved to New Delhi to pursue higher studies.
She is currently pursuing her bachelor's degree from Hindu College, University of Delhi.

Modeling and pageantry
While pursuing education in New Delhi, she started a career in modeling. She has done many modeling assignments by working as a freelance model.
In 2016 she won the title of Femina Miss Delhi, which gave her a direct entry to participate in Femina Miss India 2016, where she won the title of Femina Miss India World 2016. During her reign as Miss India, she was hospitalized because of anemia.

See also
Aditi Arya - Femina Miss World India 2015.
Koyal Rana - Femina Miss World India 2014. Winner of "Miss World Asia and Oceania"
Femina Miss India

References

External links

1996 births
Living people
People from Dhubri district
People from Guwahati
Femina Miss India winners
Beauty pageant contestants from India
Indian beauty pageant winners
Miss World 2016 delegates
Female models from Assam